Fathi Khalifa Aboud (born 25 September 1964) is a retired Libyan triple jumper.

He finished fourth at the 1983 Mediterranean Games and competed at the 1988 Summer Olympics without reaching the final. His personal best jump was 16.13 metres, achieved in 1985.

References 

1964 births
Living people
Libyan triple jumpers
Athletes (track and field) at the 1988 Summer Olympics
Olympic athletes of Libya
Athletes (track and field) at the 1983 Mediterranean Games
Mediterranean Games competitors for Libya